The 2015–16 Serbian League East is the 13th season of one of the four third level leagues in Serbian football. The league consists of 16 teams. A higher level of competition is the First League, while the lower three Zone Leagues are West, East and South.

Clubs 2015–16

Stadiums and locations

League table

Results

Top goalscorers
As of matches played on 29 May 2016.

References

External links
 srbijasport.net
 fsris.org.rs

Serbian League East seasons
3
Serb